Peter or Pyotr Parfenovich Vlasov, better known under his pen name Vladimirov, (1905 – 10 September 1953) was a Soviet diplomat and journalist. He is best known for The Vladimirov Diaries, in which he recounted the events in Yan'an during the Second World War, particularly information on Mao Zedong.

From May 1938 through to November 1945, he served as a correspondent for the Telegraph Agency of the Soviet Union (TASS).  At the same time, from May 1942 to 1945, Vladimirov also acted as a liaison officer for Comintern to the headquarters of the Communist Party of China in Yan'an, the capital of the so-called Shaanxi-Gansu-Ningxia Border Region.

In The Vladimirov Diaries, he recounted events in Yan'an during the Second World War. The diary criticized Mao's government and has been heavily edited for Soviet propaganda purposes.

Vladimirov's last appointment was as a Soviet ambassador to Burma (1952); but, due to illness and death, he was unable to start working at that position.

Vlasov was married to Maria Danilovna Vlasova; they had two sons, Boris and Yury (1935 - 2021). Yury became an Olympic champion in weightlifting and a prominent writer, he published his father's diaries in 1973, twenty years after his death.

References

1905 births
1953 deaths
People from Voronezh Governorate
Communist Party of the Soviet Union members
Ambassadors of the Soviet Union to Myanmar
Soviet journalists
Russian male journalists
Recipients of the Order of Lenin
20th-century Russian journalists
Recipients of the Order of the Red Banner
Recipients of the Order of the Red Star